Gentiana wissmannii, commonly known as New England gentian, is a flowering plant in the family Gentianaceae and is endemic to New South Wales. It is a small, upright annual herb with blue flowers.

Description

Taxonomy and naming
Gentiana wissmannii was first formally described in 1988 by John Beaumont Williams and the description was published in Telopea. The specific epithet (wissmannii) is in honour of Hans Wissmann.

Distribution and habitat
This Gentiana has a restricted distribution, it grows on the edges of swamps near Ebor in New South Wales.

Conservation status
Gentiana wissmannii is classified as "vulnerable" under the New South Wales Environment Protection and Biodiversity Conservation Act.

References

wissmannii
Flora of New South Wales